Statistics of American Soccer League II in season 1957–58.

League standings

References

American Soccer League II (RSSSF)

American Soccer League (1933–1983) seasons
American Soccer League, 1957-58